Sir Laurence Henry Philip Magnus, 3rd Baronet, CBE (born September 1955) is a British executive who has worked as a financier in the City of London, and was appointed as the UK Prime Minister's  Independent Adviser on Ministers' Interests in December 2022.

Life and career
He was educated at Eton College and Christ Church, Oxford, and is the 3rd Baronet of Tangley Hill, a title he inherited upon the death of his uncle, Sir Philip Magnus-Allcroft in 1988. 

Magnus had a four-decade career in finance in the City of London, including chairing Lexicon Partners and acting as a senior adviser at the investment banking firm Evercore.  

He served as Deputy Chairman of the National Trust between 2005 and 2013. In September 2013 he was appointed chairman of the Historic Buildings and Monuments Commission for England, by Secretary of State for Culture Maria Miller; and was tasked with dividing the organisation into two:  Historic England, which retained the statutory and protection functions, and the new English Heritage Trust, a charity that would operate the historic properties, and retained the English Heritage operating name and logo. During the COVID-19 pandemic he was appointed to the board of the Culture Recovery Fund, a fund established by the UK government to help cultural bodies affected by the pandemic. Magnus was appointed a CBE in the 2022 New Year Honours.

On 22 December 2022 he was appointed by Prime Minister Rishi Sunak to the role of Independent Adviser on Ministers' Interests, following Christopher Geidt, who had stepped down from the position in June 2022. The role is a non-renewable five-year appointment.

References

1955 births
Living people
20th-century British people
21st-century British people
Alumni of Christ Church, Oxford
Magnus, Sir Laurie, 3rd Baronet
British civil servants
British financiers
Commanders of the Order of the British Empire
People educated at Eton College